Julián Fernández (born 3 January 2004) is an Argentine professional footballer who plays as a winger for Argentine Primera División club Vélez Sarsfield.

Career statistics

Club

Notes

References

2004 births
Living people
Argentine footballers
Association football wingers
Argentine Primera División players
Club Atlético Vélez Sarsfield footballers